The Cambridge History of South Africa is a two volume history of South Africa published by Cambridge University Press in 2009 (Vol. 1) and 2011 (Vol. 2).

Volumes
Volume 1: From Early Times to 1885. 2009. Edited by Carolyn Hamilton, Bernard K. Mbenga, and Robert Ross. 
Volume 2: 1885–1994. 2011. Edited by Robert Ross, Anne Kelk Mager, and Bill Nasson.

See also
The Oxford History of South Africa

References 

History of South Africa
Cambridge University Press books
History books about Africa
2009 non-fiction books
2011 non-fiction books